"Ni Bien Ni Mal" (stylized in upper case; English: "Neither Good Nor Bad") is a song by Puerto Rican rapper Bad Bunny. The song was released through Rimas Entertainment on May 4, 2019 from his album, X 100pre (2018). It was written by Benito Martinez and Ismael Flores and produced by Tainy and La Paciencia.

Composition
This is a Latin trap song in which Bad Bunny raps about no longer being affected by a recent breakup, affirming he will move on by not thinking about it or taking action, thus becoming emotionally neutral. Yes

Music video
The music video for "Ni Bien Ni Mal" was released on May 4, 2019. It was directed by Jessy Terrero and stars Bad Bunny and Dominican model Anyelina Sanchez. In the video, Bad Bunny is shown stranded on an island surrounded by pink bunnies and attractive women. The video has over 190 million views on YouTube as of August 2022.

Controversy
The music video was criticized for the use of bunnies with pink-dyed fur. Fans took to social media to criticize Bad Bunny and express concern over this issue. As a result from these complaints, Jessy Terrero, the director of the video, released a statement on Instagram, as well as his official website, addressing the bunnies in the video. In the statement, Terrero stated that the use of pink bunnies in the video was his idea and not Bad Bunny's, and that he was "solely responsible for not only their use but also their treatment." In addition, he assured fans that the bunnies "were treated ethically and under the care by experts and that I would have never continued with the production if I was not confident that the animals would not be harmed."

Charts

Certifications

References

2018 singles
2018 songs
Bad Bunny songs
Spanish-language songs
Songs written by Bad Bunny
Music video controversies
Music videos directed by Jessy Terrero